Paul Louis Hardcastle (born 10 December 1957) is a British composer, musician, producer, songwriter, radio presenter and multi-instrumentalist. He is best known for his song "19", which went to number 1 in the UK Singles Chart in 1985.

Early life
Born in Kensington in London on 10 December 1957, he is the son of Joyce (née Everett, 1930–1991) and Louis Hardcastle (1915–2000).

Career
Hardcastle began his career in 1981 when he became the keyboard player for British soul band Direct Drive. In 1982, Hardcastle and lead vocalist Derek Green left the band to form a duo under the name First Light. They achieved some minor success in the UK charts, but the project was abandoned after two years and Hardcastle pursued a solo career.

He achieved some success with his early singles, including the 1984 electro-funk/freestyle/instrumental track, "Rain Forest", which along with the track "Sound Chaser", reached number two on the dance chart. "Rain Forest" also hit number five on the soul chart and number fifty-seven on the Billboard Hot 100.

Hardcastle is best known for the 1985 single "19", which went to No. 1 in the UK (for five weeks), as well as several other countries worldwide. It also reached number 15 in the U.S. Pop chart and number 1 in the U.S. Dance charts. The song received the Ivor Novello Award for Best-selling single of 1985. The follow-up single to "19" was "Just for Money", which reached No. 19 in the UK. It also charted in several other European countries.

In 1986, Hardcastle released a remix to "One Wish" by Hiroshima. In the same year, Hardcastle's "The Wizard" was adopted as the theme tune for the BBC's Top of the Pops weekly chart show. The theme tune was used from 3 April 1986 to 26 September 1991.

The song "Don't Waste My Time", became Hardcastle's second UK top ten in March 1986. It featured singer Carol Kenyon, a backing vocalist of Heaven 17. In late 1986, Hardcastle collaborated with the supergroup Disco Aid (later rebranded as Dance Aid in 1987) co-producing the charity single "Give Give Give".

In 1989, Hardcastle resumed working on First Light, collaborating with vocalist Kevin Henry, whom he had worked with on previous recordings.

Since the 1990s, Hardcastle has recorded several synth jazz albums, alternating releases under the pseudonyms Kiss the Sky (with Jaki Graham) and the Jazzmasters, as well as under his real name Paul Hardcastle.

Personal life
Hardcastle married Dolores Baker in 1985, and they have three children including British DJ and singer Maxine as well as musician Paul Hardcastle Jr. who both contributed vocals to Hardcastle's Transcontinental, a 2011 collection of new music recorded with Ryan Farish.

Discography

Studio albums

Smooth jazz albums

Hardcastle series

Jazzmasters series

Chill Lounge series

Kiss the Sky with Jaki Graham

Transcontinental with Ryan Farish

Compilations

Singles

Unreleased promotional tracks
This is a list of several unreleased tracks that were made by Paul Hardcastle that were originally intended to have been used to promote the Lego Bionicle toyline in 2001.

These tracks were originally meant to have been included with the Bionicle Power Pack CD package that was later released in the same year.

See also
 List of number-one dance hits (United States)
 List of artists who reached number one on the US Dance chart
 List of 1980s one-hit wonders in the United States
 List of performers on Top of the Pops
 List of smooth jazz performers
 List of synthpop artists
 List of artists who reached number one on the UK Singles Chart

References

External links
 Official website
 Trippin 'n' Rhythm Records
 Paul Hardcastle charts
 

1957 births
Living people
British freestyle musicians
British synth-pop musicians
British jazz keyboardists
Chrysalis Records artists
English boogie musicians
English electro musicians
English keyboardists
English male composers
English multi-instrumentalists
English radio presenters
English record producers
English songwriters
Musicians from London
People from Kensington
Profile Records artists
Smooth jazz musicians
British male jazz musicians
British male songwriters